Crime in Belgium is countered by the Belgian Police and other agencies.

Crime by type

Murder 

In 2012, Belgium had a murder rate of 1.8 per 100,000 population. There were a total of 182 murders in Belgium in 2012.

Theft 
Muggings, purse snatchings, and pocket picking occur frequently, particularly in major cities. Thieves often loiter in transportation hubs like the Metro (subway) and train stations to take advantage of disoriented or distracted travelers.

Corruption 

Public trust in the civil service and the judiciary is high, and perception of corruption is low in Belgium.

Crime dynamics

Crime and racial tension
A study based on data from 1999 concluded that minors of non-European nationality were overrepresented in crime statistics.  While 4.4% of the Belgian population has a non-European nationality, 19% of all prosecuted cases, and 24% of cases presented in youth court involved non-European nationals.

Terrorism and crime

Besides general safety issues in some boroughs, Brussels reportedly serves as a hub for terrorists, as reported by various sources such as Interpol, and local newspapers such as Het Nieuwsblad. In the same boroughs that pose safety problems (e.g. Sint-Jans-Molenbeek, Schaerbeek, ...) there is radicalisation. This remains however very limited in scale, the occurrence of Belgian nationals directly linked to international terrorism hovering around 0.1-1 per million inhabitants for the last decade.

The two Tunisian nationals who assassinated Commander Massoud in Afghanistan had fake Belgian passports, and the Moroccan Islamic Combatant Group (Groupe Islamique Combattant Marocain, or GICM) has links in Belgium too - there were arrests in Brussels and Antwerp of individuals  involved in the Madrid bombing.  As a result, stringent measures were taken against passport and other official documents forging.

Belgium has also seen hate crimes against visible minorities recently, including the Hans Van Themsche case, the Patrick Mombaerts case or other acts of racist violence.

Crime and politics
Much reported in newspapers were Mayor Moureaux of Molenbeeks's failed attempts at revitalizing the Brussels municipality. An example was the withdrawal of BBDO in June 2011 from the town. In an open letter addressed to Moureaux, ten employees of this American advertising agency cited over 150 attacks on their staff by locals as principal reason for their departure. As a result, serious questions were raised about governance, security, and the administration of Mayor Moureaux.

This played in a wider context of left-right wing political discord lining up with Belgium's Flemish-Walloons language conflict. The case became emblematic of perceived Walloon socialist plotting to let neighbourhoods degrade (by inviting immigrants and offering them social security) to create socialist-voting poor constituents. The Walloon side thought it showed how Flemish media, mostly controlled by openly nationalist families, push a right-wing and xenophobic agenda.

By location

Brussels 
According to Urban Audit, in 2001, Brussels had the fourth highest number of recorded crimes of European capitals (behind Stockholm, Amsterdam, and Berlin, and virtually on a par with Helsinki). According to the same source, Brussels had a rate of 10 murders or violent deaths per 100,000 citizens.

Usually, serious safety issues in Brussels are mostly limited to residential boroughs with a low income population.

Other cities 
Belgium's second largest city, Antwerp, saw crime rates about 20% below those of Brussels. Liège and Charleroi, industrial cities with high unemployment rates, saw more elevated crime rates than the less industrialized cities of Ghent and Bruges. The rural areas are generally extremely safe.

See also
 Joe Van Holsbeeck
 Murder of Karel van Noppen

References

 
 Belgium USA Department of State.
 Urban Audit: How cities rank
  Abnormaal veel minderjarige allochtonen in criminaliteitscijfers, Het Laatste Nieuws.
 BBC News Belgian 'suicide bomber' is named.
 Belgian Federal Police  (See  versions for the most detailed statistics).

External links

 urbanaudit.org
 OSAC: Belgium 2013 Crime & Safety Report